KQKY (105.9 FM) is a radio station broadcasting a Top 40 (CHR) format. Licensed to Kearney, Nebraska, United States, the station serves the Grand Island-Kearney area. The station is currently owned by NRG Media and features syndicated programming, Liveline with Mason Kelter during weeknights, Rick Dees Weekly Top 40 and Sunday Night Slow Jams on weekends. KQKY is a sister station to KGFW and KRNY.

References

External links

QKY
Contemporary hit radio stations in the United States
NRG Media radio stations